Maternus was a former soldier of the Roman Empire who rebelled during the reign of Commodus.

In popular culture 
There is a play based upon the story of Maternus as told by Herodian.

References 

Roman rebels
Ancient Roman soldiers